Blake Michael Taylor (born August 17, 1995) is an American-British professional baseball pitcher for the Houston Astros of Major League Baseball (MLB), and the Great Britain national team. Taylor was drafted by the Pittsburgh Pirates in the 2nd round of the 2013 MLB draft.  He made his MLB debut in 2020 as a member of the Astros.

Career
Taylor attended Dana Hills High School in Dana Point, California. Taylor was drafted by the Pittsburgh Pirates in the 2nd round, with the 51st overall selection, of the 2013 MLB draft.

Pittsburgh Pirates
Taylor spent his professional debut season of 2013 with the GCL Pirates, going 0–2 with a 2.57 ERA over 21 innings.

New York Mets
On June 14, 2014, Taylor was traded to the New York Mets as the PTBNL in a trade that had also sent Zack Thornton to the Mets, in exchange for Ike Davis. Taylor split the 2014 season between the GCL Mets and the Kingsport Mets, going a combined 4–1 with a 3.95 ERA over  innings.

In 2015, Taylor split the season between the GCL and the Brooklyn Cyclones, combining to go 0–0 with a 2.25 ERA over 12 innings.

In 2016, Taylor made five appearances for Kingsport, going 0–0 with a 4.15 ERA in  innings.

In 2017, Taylor spent the season with the Columbia Fireflies, going 1–9 with a 4.94 ERA over  innings.

In 2018, Taylor split the season between the St. Lucie Mets and the Las Vegas 51s, going a combined 3–8 with a 5.40 ERA over  innings.

In 2019, Taylor split the season between St. Lucie, the Binghamton Rumble Ponies, and the Syracuse Mets, combining to go 2–3 with a 2.16 ERA over  innings. Following the 2019 season, Taylor played for the Scottsdale Scorpions of the Arizona Fall League. On November 4, 2019, Taylor was added to the Mets 40-man roster.

Houston Astros
On December 5, 2019, Taylor and Kenedy Corona were traded to the Houston Astros in exchange for Jake Marisnick. On July 24, 2020, Taylor pitched a scoreless inning in his MLB debut against the Seattle Mariners. On August 17, he earned first MLB career save.

In 2020, he was 2–1 with one save and a 2.18 ERA in which he pitched  innings over 22 relief appearances.

In 2021, he was 4–4 with a 3.16 ERA. In 50 relief appearances he pitched  innings.

On June 4, 2022, the Astros placed Taylor on the 15-day injured list due to left elbow discomfort, and transferred him to the 60-day injured list on July 1, 2022.  The Astros activated Taylor on September 13, 2022, and assigned him to the Triple-A Sugar Land Space Cowboys of the Pacific Coast League.

On January 13, 2023, Taylor avoided arbitration with the Astros, agreeing to a one-year, $830K contract for the season.

International
In September 2016, Taylor was selected for Great Britain at the 2017 World Baseball Classic Qualification, qualifying via his British father.

References

External links

1995 births
Living people
Baseball players from California
Major League Baseball players from the United Kingdom
Binghamton Rumble Ponies players
Brooklyn Cyclones players
Columbia Fireflies players
Gulf Coast Mets players
Gulf Coast Pirates players
Houston Astros players
Kingsport Mets players
Las Vegas 51s players
Major League Baseball pitchers
National baseball team players
Scottsdale Scorpions players
Sportspeople from Orange, California
St. Lucie Mets players
Sugar Land Skeeters players
Sugar Land Space Cowboys players
Syracuse Mets players